Ralph's World is a children's music group created by Ralph Covert, previously of Chicago-based indie-rock group the Bad Examples. Covert uses high rock and roll energy with kid-friendly lyrics.

Ralph's World's Green Gorilla, Monster & Me was nominated for Best Musical Album for Children, at the 48th Grammy Awards.

A collection of lyrics and artwork titled Ralph's World Rocks was released in August 2008 from Henry Holt Books for Young Readers.

"At the Bottom of the Sea" is likely the most well known song by Ralph's World, due to it being included on RCA Lyra mp3 players in the early 2000s.

Studio albums 
 Ralph's World (2001)
 At the Bottom of the Sea (2002)
 Happy Lemons (2002)
 Peggy's Pie Parlor (2003)
 The Amazing Adventures of Kid Astro (2004)
 Green Gorilla, Monster & Me (2005)
 The Rhyming Circus (2008)
 All Around Ralph’s World (2010)
 Time Machine Guitar (2017)
 RWd10 (2021)
 RWdChristmas11 (2021)

External links
 Ralph's World Homepage
 Ralph's World at the Waterdog Music website
 Ralph's World Rocks Bookpage

Ralph's World
Musical groups established in 1991
Walt Disney Records artists